General Ransom may refer to:

Matt Whitaker Ransom (1826–1904), Confederate States Army brigadier general
Robert Ransom Jr. (1828–1892), Confederate States Army major general
Thomas E. G. Ransom (1834–1864), Union Army brigadier general
Truman B. Ransom (1802–1847), Vermont Militia major general

See also
Algernon Ransome (1883–1969), British Army major general
Enitan Ransome-Kuti (born 1964), Nigerian Army brigadier general